"Bird on the Wire" is one of Leonard Cohen's signature songs. It was recorded 26 September 1968 in Nashville and included on his 1969 album Songs from a Room. A May 1968 recording produced by David Crosby, titled "Like a Bird", was added to the 2007 remastered CD. Judy Collins was the first to release the song on her 1968 album Who Knows Where the Time Goes. Joe Cocker also covered the song on his second studio album the following year.

In the 1960s, Cohen lived on the Greek island Hydra with his girlfriend Marianne Ihlen, the woman depicted on the back cover of Songs from a Room. She has related how she helped him out of a depression by handing him his guitar, whereupon he began composing "Bird on the Wire", inspired by a bird sitting on one of Hydra's recently installed phone wires, followed by memories of wet island nights. He finished it in a Hollywood motel.

Cohen has described "Bird on the Wire" as a simple country song, and the first recording, by Judy Collins, was indeed done in a country setting. He later made various minor changes, such as the modifications present on Cohen Live. Different renditions are included on all of his live albums. On occasion he also performed Serge Lama's French version, "Vivre tout seul", in concert.

In the sleevenotes to a 2007 rerelease of  Songs From A Room the song was described as "simultaneously a prayer and an anthem, a kind of Bohemian 'My Way'."

Composition 
In the liner notes to the 1975 compilation The Best of Leonard Cohen, Cohen wrote about the song:
I always begin my concert with this song. It seems to return me to my duties. It was begun in Greece and finished in a motel in Hollywood    around 1969 along with everything else.  Some lines were changed in Oregon.  I can't seem to get it perfect.  Kris Kristofferson informed me that I had stolen part of the melody from another Nashville writer. He also said that he's putting the first couple of lines on his tombstone, and I'll be hurt if he doesn't.
It has been suggested that the song to which Kristofferson was referring is "Turn Me On", written by Nashville songwriter John D. Loudermilk, which was originally recorded by Mark Dinning in 1961 and later covered by many other artists, including Nina Simone, and which shares a similar melody and some lyrical patterns with Cohen's song.

Cover versions 
Many artists have covered the song, often as "Bird on a Wire" (indeed, this variation appears in the compilation The Essential Leonard Cohen), including:
Joe Cocker on Joe Cocker! (1969) and the live album Mad Dogs & Englishmen (1970) (#78 in Canada)
Esther Ofarim on "Esther Ofarim" (1969)
Dave Van Ronk on Van Ronk (1971)
Tim Hardin on the album Bird on a Wire (1971)
Rita Coolidge on the album The Lady's Not for Sale (1972)
Fairport Convention on the album Heyday: the BBC Radio Sessions, 1968–1969 (1987)
Jennifer Warnes on the tribute album Famous Blue Raincoat (1987)
The Neville Brothers on the album Brother's Keeper (1990); also included in Bird on a Wire (1990) starring Mel Gibson and Goldie Hawn
Johnny Cash on the album American Recordings (1994), and also live with orchestra (released on the 2003 compilation Unearthed)
Willie Nelson on the tribute album Tower of Song (1995)
Tex, Don and Charlie on the album Monday Morning Coming Down... (1995)
k.d. lang on the album Hymns of the 49th Parallel (2004)
Jimmy Barnes and Troy Cassar-Daley on the album Double Happiness (2006). Peaked at number 59 on the ARIA Charts.
Elvis Costello performed the song at the 2017 Tower of Song: A Memorial Tribute to Leonard Cohen concert.

Further utilization 
 A cover is featured in the concluding scenes of director Robert Altman's 1978 film A Wedding.
 It was also featured in the film Bird on a Wire.

Charts

Decade-end charts

References

Further reading

External links 
Lyrics (Songs from a Room version)
Lyrics (Cohen Live version)

Songs about hotels and motels
Leonard Cohen songs
1968 songs
Songs written by Leonard Cohen
Tim Hardin songs
Song recordings produced by Bob Johnston
Columbia Records singles